Anereuthina renosa is a species of moth of the family Erebidae. It is found in Sundaland, the Philippines and Burma. The habitat consists of hill dipterocarp forests, lower montane forests and lowland forests.

The forewings are caramel brown, variably traversed by pale mauve fasciation. There is usually a marking in the centre of the forewing, that may consist of two small black or fawn ellipses or a disc. The hindwings are duller brown.

The larvae feed on Elaeis species. Pupation takes place in a silken cocoon within a leaf.

References

Anereuthina
Moths described in 1823
Moths of Asia